Scopula sublobata is a moth of the  family Geometridae. It is found in Malawi and South Africa.

References

sublobata
Lepidoptera of Malawi
Lepidoptera of South Africa
Moths of Sub-Saharan Africa
Moths described in 1898